These are the official results of the Women's Heptathlon competition at the 1997 World Championships in Athens, Greece.

Medalists

Schedule

Sunday, August 3

Monday, August 4

Results

References
 Results
 IAAF

H
Heptathlon at the World Athletics Championships
1997 in women's athletics